Yangchenghu Station is the North-Eastern terminus Line 5, Suzhou Rail Transit. The station is located in Suzhou Industrial Park, Jiangsu. It has been in use since June 29, 2021; when Line 5 first opened to the public, and is located on the south bank of Yangcheng Lake.

References 

Railway stations in Suzhou
Suzhou Rail Transit stations
Railway stations in China opened in 2021